Faust (German for "fist") is the debut studio album by German rock band Faust. It was released in 1971 through Polydor Records. Although it was never a commercial success, Faust has garnered much retrospective acclaim from rock critics.

Background 
In 1971, Polydor entered a deal with Uwe Nettelbeck to assemble a musical ensemble that could compete with the likes of The Rolling Stones, The Kinks, and Small Faces. Before the release of their debut, Faust would send tapes to Polydor containing anything from studio experiments to recordings of someone washing dishes.

Cover artwork 
The original LP record was on clear vinyl in a clear cover with an X-ray of a human fist silkscreened on the outer sleeve. It also included a transparent plastic sheet with the lyrics and credits printed in red.

Release and reception 

AllMusic critic Archie Patterson lauded the band's accomplishment, writing: "The impact of Faust cannot be overstated; their debut album was truly a revolutionary step forward in the progress of 'rock music.'" He awarded Faust four and a half out of five stars, concluding that "the level of imagination is staggering, the concept is totally unique and it's fun to listen to as well."

Track listing

Personnel 

Faust
Werner "Zappi" Diermaier – drums
Hans Joachim Irmler – organ
Arnulf Meifert – drums
Jean-Hervé Péron – bass guitar
Rudolf Sosna – guitar, keyboards
Gunther Wüsthoff – synthesiser, saxophone

Additional musicians and production
Kurt Graupner – engineering
Andy Hertel – illustration
Uwe Nettelbeck – production, design

References

External links 
 
 faust-pages.com. Clear.

1971 debut albums
Faust (band) albums
Polydor Records albums
Recommended Records albums
Albums produced by Uwe Nettelbeck
Sound collage albums